The climate of Virginia, a state on the east coast of the United States, is considered mild compared to more northern areas of the United States such as New England and the Midwest. Most of Virginia east of the Blue Ridge mountains, the southern part of the Shenandoah Valley, and the Roanoke Valley, has a humid subtropical climate (Köppen climate classification Cfa). In the mountainous areas west of the Blue Ridge, the climate is warm-summer humid continental (Köppen Dfb) or oceanic climate (Köppen Cfb).  Severe weather, in the form of tornadoes, tropical cyclones, and winter storms, impacts the state on a regular basis. Central Virginia received significant snowfall of 20 inches in December 2009.

Climate zones

A lot of variations occur because of the state's significant relief. Elevations in Virginia vary from sea level to Mount Rogers at 5,729 ft (1,746 m) above sea level, with major gradations occurring at the edges of the Atlantic Ocean, the end of the Piedmont, and the Blue Ridge and Allegheny chains of the Appalachian Mountains. The moderating influence of the ocean from the east, powered by the Gulf Stream, also creates the potential for hurricanes near the mouth of Chesapeake Bay. Cold air masses arrive over the mountains, especially in winter, which can lead to significant snowfalls when coastal storms known as noreasters move up the Atlantic coast.

The interaction of these elements with the state's topography create micro-climates in the Shenandoah Valley, the mountainous southwest, and the coastal plains that are slightly but noticeably distinct from each other.

Statistics for selected cities

Severe weather

Severe weather is a concern in Virginia.  Hurricanes make the coastal area of Virginia vulnerable. It is rare for a major hurricane to threaten the Virginia coast as hurricanes this far north tend to weaken due to cooler coast waters and increasingly westerly winds aloft.  Heavy rain from tropical cyclones remains a concern, however.  Hurricane Isabel in 2003 brought much destruction from wind and rain, killing 10 directly and doing nearly two billion dollars in damage.  Hurricane Gaston in 2004 inundated Richmond after moving ashore South Carolina.  Virginia is often struck with the remnants of systems which hit along the Gulf of Mexico coastline, which also bring torrential rain to the state.  Hurricane Camille was an extreme example, bringing  of rainfall to portions of Nelson County in a matter of hours.  Thunderstorms are an occasional concern with the state averaging anywhere from 35 to 45 days of thunderstorm activity annually.

Rainfall in Virginia is frequent, but does not normally get severe enough for floods. Virginia averages seven tornadoes annually, though most are F2 and lower on the Fujita scale. However, Virginia had eighty-five in 2004. Western Virginia has a lower rate of tornadoes.

Climate change

Seasons
In Virginia, it is characterized by large swings in temperature throughout and between days; This does not happen every day of the month, however. It may be 50 degrees and windy one morning, and 70 degrees and calm the next afternoon. In Winter, it gets quite cold. Temperatures usually range from the 50s to the high 20s in December; While in January, it can range from the 40s, all the way down to the teens. Snowfall can be moderate or high during the Winter. Almost every year, Virginia receives snow during December, and every year in January-February.
In the summer, temperatures are hot and humid. Precipitation is slightly greater. Temperatures are not extreme, ranging between the high 70s and mid 90s; but humidity can make it seem hotter.

As for sunlight, Virginia is about average in state rankings. Areas on the Chesapeake Coast and Eastern Shore are brightest, while the west and north of the state is more cloudy. On the Winter Solstice, Virginia gets between 9 and 10 hours of sunlight. On the summer solstice, it gets between 14.5 and 15 hours.

See also
Environment of Virginia
List of wettest known tropical cyclones in Virginia
United States tropical cyclone rainfall climatology

Notes

References

External links
Virginia Hurricane History - NWS

 
Natural history of Virginia
Virginia